
Gmina Kamienna Góra is a rural gmina (administrative district) in Kamienna Góra County, Lower Silesian Voivodeship, in south-western Poland. Its seat is the town of Kamienna Góra, although the town is not part of the territory of the gmina.

Neighbouring gminas
Gmina Kamienna Góra is bordered by the towns of Kamienna Góra and Kowary, and the gminas of Czarny Bór, Janowice Wielkie, Lubawka, Marciszów, Mieroszów and Mysłakowice.

Villages
The gmina contains the villages of Czadrów, Czarnów, Dębrznik, Dobromyśl, Gorzeszów, Janiszów, Jawiszów, Kochanów, Krzeszów, Krzeszówek, Leszczyniec, Lipienica, Nowa Białka, Ogorzelec, Olszyny, Pisarzowice, Przedwojów, Ptaszków, Raszów, Rędziny and Szarocin.

References

Kamienna Gora
Kamienna Góra County